Maurren Higa Maggi (born June 25, 1976, in São Carlos) is a former Brazilian track and field athlete and Olympic gold medallist. She is the South American record holder in the 100 metres hurdles and long jump, with 12.71 seconds and 7.26 metres respectively. She also has a best of 14.53 metres in the triple jump – a former South American record. She is the first Brazilian woman to win an Olympic gold medal in an individual sport.

In 2003, Maurren got in a doping scandal after clostebol was found on her sample. She claimed that an anti-scarring gel sheet that she used contained the anabolic steroid in its composition. Maurren was suspended for two years, preventing her from participating in the 2003 Pan American Games. She missed going to the Olympic Games due to a pregnancy.

She finished second at the 2009 Troféu Brasil Caixa de Atletismo to Keila Costa, losing the event for the first time since 1998.

Maurren was married to racer Antônio Pizzonia, with whom she has a daughter, Sophia.

International competitions

100 metres hurdles 
2001 Universiade - silver medal
2001 South American Championships - gold medal
1999 Pan American Games - silver medal
1999 South American Championships - gold medal
1997 South American Championships - silver medal

Long jump 
2011 Pan American Games - gold medal
2011 South American Championships - gold medal
2008 Summer Olympics - gold medal
2008 IAAF World Indoor Championships - silver medal
2007 Pan American Games - gold medal
2003 IAAF World Indoor Championships - bronze medal
2002 Ibero-American Championships - gold medal
2002 IAAF World Cup - silver medal
2001 Universiade - gold medal
2001 South American Championships - gold medal
1999 Pan American Games - gold medal
1999 Universiade - bronze medal
1999 South American Championships - gold medal
1997 South American Championships - gold medal

See also
List of doping cases in athletics

References

External links
 
 
 

1976 births
Living people
People from São Carlos
Brazilian female long jumpers
Brazilian female hurdlers
Olympic athletes of Brazil
Olympic gold medalists for Brazil
Athletes (track and field) at the 2000 Summer Olympics
Athletes (track and field) at the 2008 Summer Olympics
Athletes (track and field) at the 2012 Summer Olympics
Medalists at the 2008 Summer Olympics
Pan American Games gold medalists for Brazil
Pan American Games medalists in athletics (track and field)
Athletes (track and field) at the 1999 Pan American Games
Athletes (track and field) at the 2007 Pan American Games
Athletes (track and field) at the 2011 Pan American Games
World Athletics Championships athletes for Brazil
Brazilian sportspeople in doping cases
Doping cases in athletics
Brazilian people of Italian descent
Pan American Games silver medalists for Brazil
Olympic gold medalists in athletics (track and field)
Universiade medalists in athletics (track and field)
Goodwill Games medalists in athletics
Universiade gold medalists for Brazil
Universiade silver medalists for Brazil
Universiade bronze medalists for Brazil
Medalists at the 1999 Summer Universiade
Medalists at the 2001 Summer Universiade
Competitors at the 2001 Goodwill Games
Medalists at the 1999 Pan American Games
Medalists at the 2011 Pan American Games
Goodwill Games gold medalists in athletics
Sportspeople from São Paulo (state)